Wang Renyuan (2 November 1910 – 24 June 1996) was a Chinese-born politician affiliated with the Kuomintang. He served in the Second Sino-Japanese War and was elected to political office in 1946. After the government of the Republic of China relocated to Taiwan, Wang served as Minister of Justice from 1970 to 1976.

Life and career
While based in Yuncheng during the Second Sino-Japanese War, Wang was captured. At the end of the war, he received the Order of Victory of Resistance against Aggression. Two years later, Wang won election as a member of the Legislative Yuan representing Tianjin. In 1961, Wang began studying in Japan, where he earned a master's in political science from Meiji University. In 1970, he was named Minister of Justice. Wang's tenure as justice minister ended in June 1976, when he was appointed an adviser to President Yen Chia-kan.

Since Wang's military service, and throughout his time in Tianjin, he had been appointed to increasingly prestigious positions within the Kuomintang. In May 1978, he left the central government for his final party post. His death in 1996 was marked by a presidential decree issued by Lee Teng-hui.

Wang's grandson Chris Lu was born in the United States and worked for Barack Obama.

References

1910 births
1996 deaths
Members of the 1st Legislative Yuan
Members of the 1st Legislative Yuan in Taiwan
Kuomintang Members of the Legislative Yuan in Taiwan
Taiwanese Ministers of Justice
Meiji University alumni
Republic of China politicians from Tianjin
Taiwanese people from Tianjin
Chinese Civil War refugees
Military personnel of the Republic of China in the Second Sino-Japanese War
Taiwanese expatriates in Japan
Chinese prisoners of war
World War II prisoners of war held by Japan